Nebiriau II (also Nebiryraw II, Nebiryerawet II) was an ancient Egyptian pharaoh of the Theban-based 16th Dynasty, during the Second Intermediate Period.

Identity
He is commonly assumed by some Egyptologists to be the son of his predecessor Nebiryraw I, given the rarity of the name Nebiriau in Egyptian historical sources. Unlike his presumed father who ruled Upper Egypt for 26 years, he was an obscure king who is completely unattested by contemporary archaeological sources.

The only two non-contemporary attestations for Nebiriau II are the mention of his personal name on the Ramesside Turin Canon (position 13.5, his throne name was lost), and a bronze statuette of the god Harpocrates (Cairo 38189). The four sides of the base of the statue were inscribed with the names written into cartouches; these are "Binpu", "Ahmose", "The good god Sewadjenre, deceased" and "The good god Neferkare, deceased" respectively. The first two were likely two princes of the royal family of the 17th Dynasty which would replace the 16th Dynasty shortly thereafter; Sewadjenre was the throne name of Nebiriau I and finally, it is believed that Neferkare is the otherwise unattested throne name of Nebiriau II. The finding is also peculiar because the cult of Harpocrates – and thus the statuette itself – dates back to the Ptolemaic period i.e. about 1500 years after the people named on the statuette had lived.
 
Nebiriau II was succeeded by an equally obscure king named Semenre who is attested by a single axe – inscribed with his throne name – and then by Seuserenre Bebiankh who is given 12 years in the Turin Canon.

References

17th-century BC Pharaohs
16th-century BC Pharaohs
Pharaohs of the Sixteenth Dynasty of Egypt